Terry Lee Gabreski ( Walter; born 1952) is a retired senior officer of the United States Air Force (USAF). She was the second woman to hold the rank of lieutenant general in the USAF. She was the Vice Commander, Air Force Materiel Command, Wright-Patterson Air Force Base, Ohio, which conducts research, development, test and evaluation, and provides acquisition management and logistics support necessary to keep Air Force weapon systems ready for war. She is the daughter of retired Air Force Brigadier General Alonzo Walter and the daughter-in-law of World War II and Korean War fighter ace Colonel Gabby Gabreski.

Education and personal life
Gabreski was born Terry Lee Walter in 1952, the daughter of United States Air Force (USAF) Brigadier General Alonzo J. Walter, Jr. (born 1928), then a test pilot, and Doris Walter, who had also been a commissioned officer. After completing her Bachelor of Arts degree in history at Louisiana State University, where she was a member of Delta Delta Delta, Gabreski joined the USAF, attended Air Force Officer Training School, and was commissioned a second lieutenant on 10 September 1974. She later received a Master of Public Administration degree from Golden Gate University in 1978. Gabreski also attended the Executive Program for Senior Officials in National Security which was conducted in 1994 by the John F. Kennedy School of Government, Harvard University, Cambridge, Massachusetts and the General Manager Program, Harvard Business School, Cambridge, Massachusetts in 2002.

In 1983 she was selected as the USAF Aircraft Maintenance Company Grade Officer of the Year and was awarded the Eugene M. Zuckert Management Award in 1999 as recognition for her top-level Air Force management skills.

In 1989 she married Colonel Donald Francis Gabreski (born 1949), a retired USAF pilot, eldest son of World War II and Korean War ace, Colonel Francis S. "Gabby" Gabreski, and they had two sons, born in 1992 and 1995. On her retirement Gabreski noted that she applied three times for pilot training but had been turned down each time because, being only five feet tall, she could not meet minimum height requirements for the T-38 Talon trainer.

Assignments
Prior to her final assignment, Gabreski served as commander of the Oklahoma City Air Logistics Center at Tinker Air Force Base from December 2003 to August 2005, which was the first Air Force installation to implement National Security Personnel System. She also served as Director of Logistics, Headquarters Air Force Materiel Command from August 2001 to December 2003, and as Director of Maintenance for the Deputy Chief of Staff for Installations and Logistics at Headquarters United States Air Force from January 2000 to August 2001.

Other than these assignments she directed two aircraft maintenance units, served as a squadron maintenance supervisor in three units, commanded three maintenance squadrons and a logistics group and served at the Air Staff, Secretary of the Air Force and Joint Staff levels.

Gabreski also served as one of the original female Air Training Officers charged with mentoring the first female cadets of the U.S. Air Force Academy. Then-Lt. Gabreski served in this role from January 1976 to September 1977 for the Class of 1980 female cadets.

During Operation Allied Force in the 1999 air war against Yugoslavia, Gabreski directed logistics efforts as the A-4 for the air war across the entire theater. She holds a master aircraft maintenance badge and a basic parachute rating.

Awards and decorations

Effective dates of promotion

See also
Military of the United States
 List of female United States military generals and flag officers

References

External links
USAF Biography: Lieutenant General Terry L. Gabreski
Columbus, Ohio, to celebrate 'Air Force Heritage Week' National Guard Bureau
AFMC vice addresses Aerospace Summit crowd Official newspaper of Oklahoma City Air Logistics Center
Air Force Materiel Command Website

Living people
Harvard Kennedy School alumni
Louisiana State University alumni
Recipients of the Air Force Distinguished Service Medal
Recipients of the Legion of Merit
Female generals of the United States Air Force
Women in 21st-century warfare
Recipients of the Defense Superior Service Medal
1952 births
21st-century American women